City of Anatol is a 1936 German drama film directed by Viktor Tourjansky and starring Gustav Fröhlich, Brigitte Horney and Fritz Kampers. It is based on a 1932 novel City of Anatol by Bernhard Kellermann. The film is set in a small city in the Balkans, where the discovery of oil leads to a major boom. It was shot at the Babelsberg Studios in Berlin with sets designed by the art directors Otto Hunte and Willy Schiller. A separate French language version Wells in Flames (Puits en flames) was made, also directed by Tourjansky but featuring a different cast.

Cast 
 Gustav Fröhlich as Jacques Gregor
 Brigitte Horney as Franziska Maniu
 Fritz Kampers as Jaskulski
 Rose Stradner as Sonja Yvolandi
 Karl Hellmer as Xaver, Kellner
 Harry Liedtke as Garcia, Genraldirektor
 Aribert Wäscher as Melonenhändler
 Olga Engl as Sonjas Großmutter
 Ernst Behmer as ein Betrunkener
 Gerhard Bienert as Arbeiter bei Ölbohrungen
 Paul Bildt as Arbeiter Stefan
 Josef Dahmen as Arbeiter bei Gregor
 Marina von Ditmar as Rosa, eine Tänzerin
 Else Ehser as Rosas Großmutter
 Angelo Ferrari as Stefan
 Hela Gruel as Stefans Frau
 Philipp Manning as Freund von Sonjas Großmutter
 Else Reval as Frau des Melonenhändlers
 Hilde Sessak as Franziskas Dienstmädchen
 Ernst G. Schiffner as Koroschek, Hotelier
 Willi Schur as Türkischer Lorenfahrer
 Otto Stoeckel as Ledermann, ein Ölexperte
 Gertrud Wolle as Jaskulskis Schwester
 Valy Arnheim as Garcias Fahrer
 Aruth Wartan as Arbeiter
 Erich Dunskus as Baumeister im Steinbruch

References

Bibliography 
 Hake, Sabine. Popular Cinema of the Third Reich. University of Texas Press, 2010.
 Kreimeier, Klaus. The Ufa Story: A History of Germany's Greatest Film Company, 1918–1945. University of California Press, 1999.

External links 
 

1936 films
1936 drama films
German drama films
Films of Nazi Germany
1930s German-language films
Films directed by Victor Tourjansky
German black-and-white films
Films based on German novels
Films based on works by Bernhard Kellermann
Films set in Turkey
German multilingual films
Works about petroleum
UFA GmbH films
1936 multilingual films
1930s German films
Films shot at Babelsberg Studios